Jesse Aaron Vail II (February 21, 1928 – August 7, 2003) was an American football coach. He served as the head football coach at North Central College in Naperville, Illinois from 1956 to 1963 and at Culver–Stockton College in Canton, Missouri in 1966, compiling a career college football coaching record of 41–37–2.

He also served as a football coach in a number of different capacities, including as the head coach of the Joliet Explorers of the Professional Football League of America in 1965 and 1967 and at Stateville Correctional Center in 1977. He was also head coach for the Joliet Chargers when they played in the Midwest Professional Football League in 1970.

Head coaching record

College

References

External links
 

1928 births
2003 deaths
Continental Football League coaches
Culver–Stockton Wildcats football coaches
North Central Cardinals football coaches
North Dakota State Bison football coaches 
High school football coaches in Illinois
High school football coaches in Missouri
DePauw University alumni
North Dakota State University alumni
People from Evanston, Illinois
Players of American football from Illinois